Vance Gibson (born July 19, 1953) is an American football coach.  He is the offensive line coach at East Texas Baptist University in Marshall, Texas, a position he has held since 2019.  Gibson was the 18th head football coach at Howard Payne University in Brownwood, Texas, serving for 13 seasons, from 1992 to 2004, and compiling a record of Gibson 89–42.  From 2005 to 2018, he was the head football coach at Frisco High School in Frisco, Texas.

Gibson graduated from Sherman High School in Sherman, Texas in 1971.  He earned a Bachelor of Arts degree from Austin College in Sherman in 1975 and a Master of Arts from the school the following year.

Head coaching record

College

References

External links
 East Texas Baptist profile

1953 births
Living people
East Texas Baptist Tigers football coaches
Howard Payne Yellow Jackets football coaches
Iowa Wesleyan Tigers football coaches
Sam Houston Bearkats football coaches
High school football coaches in Texas
Austin College alumni
Sherman High School (Texas) alumni